Prime Asia TV is a Canada-based Punjabi TV channel catering to Punjabi understanding population across the world. The corporate office is based in Vancouver and has studios in Vancouver, Toronto and Calgary in Canada. It also has studios in Chandigarh and Jalandhar in India and the most recent one has been inaugurated in Melbourne, Australia.

External links 
  Official Website

Punjabi-language television channels
Indian diaspora in Canada